Fort Davis is an unincorporated community and census-designated place (CDP) in Jeff Davis County, Texas, United States. The population was 1,201 at the 2010 census, up from 1,050 at the 2000 census. It is the county seat of Jeff Davis County.

History
It was the site of Fort Davis, established in 1854 on the San Antonio–El Paso Road through west Texas and named after Jefferson Davis, who was then the Secretary of War under President Franklin Pierce. It was reestablished in 1867 following the civil war.

Geography
Fort Davis is located in southeastern Jeff Davis County at the southeast foot of the Davis Mountains. Texas State Highway 17 (State Street) passes through the center of town, leading northeast  to Interstate 10 at Balmorhea and southwest  to Marfa. Texas State Highway 118 joins Highway 17 through the center of Fort Davis, but leads northwest through the Davis Mountains  to I-10 and southeast  to Alpine.

Climate
Fort Davis experiences a semi-arid climate (Köppen BSk) with cool, dry winters and hot, wet summers. There is a large degree of diurnal temperature variation due to the high elevation of the area.

Demographics

2020 census

As of the 2020 United States census, there were 1,024 people, 415 households, and 317 families residing in the CDP.

2000 census
As of the census of 2000,  1,050 people, 415 households, and 298 families resided in the CDP. The population density was 188.2 people per square mile (72.7/km2). The 525 housing units averaged 94.1 per square mile (36.3/km2). The racial makeup of the CDP was 88.29% White, 0.19% African American, 0.48% Native American, 7.62% from other races, and 3.43% from two or more races. Hispanics or Latinos of any race were 49.33% of the population.

Of the 415 households, 32.0% had children under the age of 18 living with them, 57.6% were married couples living together, 10.6% had a female householder with no husband present, and 28.0% were not families. About 24.3% of all households were made up of individuals, and 9.9% had someone living alone who was 65 years of age or older. The average household size was 2.53 and the average family size was 3.02.

In the CDP, the population was spread out, with 24.7% under the age of 18, 7.4% from 18 to 24, 26.9% from 25 to 44, 25.4% from 45 to 64, and 15.6% who were 65 years of age or older. The median age was 39 years. For every 100 females, there were 102.3 males. For every 100 females age 18 and over, there were 97.3 males.

Males had a median income of $22,500 versus $20,000 for females. The per capita income for the CDP was $14,249. About 20.7% of families and 21.6% of the population were below the poverty line, including 26.3% of those under age 18 and 26.0% of those age 65 or over.

Arts and culture

Points of interest
 Chihuahuan Desert Nature Center and Botanical Gardens at the Chihuahuan Desert Research Institute
 Fort Davis National Historic Site
 The McDonald Observatory of the University of Texas at Austin
 Fort Davis is home to one of 10 dishes comprising the Very Long Baseline Array
 Davis Mountains State Park

Education

Fort Davis is served by the Fort Davis Independent School District.
 Dirks-Anderson Elementary School
 Fort Davis High School

All of Jeff Davis County is zoned to Odessa College.

Gallery

References

External links

 Handbook of Texas: Fort Davis, TX
 Fort Davis Chamber of Commerce

Census-designated places in Jeff Davis County, Texas
Census-designated places in Texas
County seats in Texas
Butterfield Overland Mail in Texas
1854 establishments in Texas